Cambóya is a sector in the city of Santiago de los Caballeros in the province of Santiago of the Dominican Republic.

Sources 
Portal del ciudadano

Santiago de los Caballeros
Populated places in Santiago Province (Dominican Republic)